XEPH-AM is a radio station in Mexico City. Broadcasting on 590 AM, XEPH-AM is owned by NRM Comunicaciones and broadcasts a tropical music format under the brand name Sabrosita.

History
The XEPH concession was awarded in November 1940, with the station coming to air in 1942.

After moving in a rock direction for years, in August 1967, the station became rock-formatted "La Pantera" (The Panther). In 1987, the station became Spanish modern rock-formatted Espacio 59, only to go back to 1960s and 1970s rock in December 1989. In 1990, XEPH became rock-formatted "Radio Alicia", and from 1992 to 1995, it became "X-Press Radio 590" with an English-language news and music format, similar to Radio VIP.

1995 saw the creation of Sabrosita, which moved to XHSON-FM 100.9 in 1999 to make way for a return of La Pantera to 590. In 2002, La Pantera was replaced again, this time with a sports radio format as Estadio 590; the next year, Estadio 590 gave way to romantic music-formatted Tuya 590.

In 2004, with the creation of the current Beat 100.9 dance music format, Sabrosita returned to 590 AM.

References

1949 establishments in Mexico
Radio stations established in 1949
Radio stations in Mexico City
Tropical music radio stations